The Lipton Institute of Tea is a dedicated tea research facility owned by consumer goods company Unilever, which also owns the Lipton tea brand. The Institute conducts studies on the mental and physical health benefits of tea. As well as research conducted directly by the Institute, it also funds and coordinates research projects at academic and research institutions around the world.

Background

The Lipton Institute of Tea is headquartered in Sharnbrook in Bedfordshire, UK. A formal tea research base was established here by Unilever in 1967. The Institute also has research centres and regional representatives located in major tea-growing regions (such as India and Kericho, Kenya, where Unilever owns tea plantations) and other key tea-drinking markets (including France, Japan, China, and the USA). The Institute claims as its mission "to promote awareness and understanding of tea, from bush to cup". The Institute also participates in and organises scientific conferences.

Integral to the Institute’s research facilities is its operation of what it claims is the world’s most northerly tea plantation at its UK headquarters. This facility grows representative samples of tea from around the world in a controlled environment.

Research
The Institute invests in clinical trials to support benefit claims and its scientific understanding of the health benefits of tea. Many of the Institute’s findings have resulted in academic publications.

Recent work has focused on theanine and flavonoid antioxidants, both of which occur naturally in tea and are claimed to have health benefits. The Institute has also funded research on heart health and stroke and, in April 2009, published the results of research conducted with the University of L'Aquila, Italy, about tea and cardiovascular health.

See also
 PG Tips, another Unilever tea brand
 L-Theanine

References

External links

Tea industry
Unilever companies
Tea in the United Kingdom
Organisations based in Bedfordshire
Organizations established in 1967
1967 establishments in the United Kingdom